Euriphene barombina, the common nymph, is a butterfly in the family Nymphalidae. It is found in eastern Ivory Coast, Ghana, Nigeria, Cameroon, Gabon, the Republic of the Congo, the Central African Republic, northern Angola and the Democratic Republic of the Congo The species is replaced further east by Euriphene saphirina. The habitat consists of forests.

The larvae feed on Combretum species.

References

Butterflies described in 1894
Euriphene
Butterflies of Africa